Mehari Tsegay (born 12 February 1999) is an Eritrean long-distance runner. 
In 2019, he competed in the senior men's race at the 2019 IAAF World Cross Country Championships held in Aarhus, Denmark. He finished in 31st place.

In 2017, he competed in the junior men's race at the 2017 IAAF World Cross Country Championships held in Kampala, Uganda.

References

External links 
 

Living people
1999 births
Place of birth missing (living people)
Eritrean male long-distance runners
Eritrean male cross country runners
21st-century Eritrean people